Love Meetings (Comizi d'amore) is a 1965 feature-length documentary, shot by Italian writer and director Pier Paolo Pasolini, who also acts as the interviewer, appearing in many scenes.

Plot
Typical for him, Pasolini's subject is sex: he questions representatives from a variety of social brackets on topics such as virginity, prostitution, homosexuality and sex education. The interviews are made in Italy.
The overarching themes are sexual ignorance, confusion and conservatism.
The film is divided into four large parts, called "Ricerche" (literally, "searches"), plus a brief prologue, in which Pasolini asks children in a poor area where babies come from (the responses include "flowers," "the stork," "Jesus and God," and "my uncle") and an epilogue, in which Pasolini recites one of his poems about marriage. Also included are conversations with acclaimed author and his friend, Alberto Moravia and psychologist Cesare Musatti, or with poet Giuseppe Ungaretti, or with a group of three women journalists, including Oriana Fallaci.

References

External links

1965 films
1960s Italian-language films
Italian documentary films
Black-and-white documentary films
Films directed by Pier Paolo Pasolini
Documentary films about sexuality
1965 documentary films
1960s Italian films